Rezső Somogyi (27 July 1887 – 28 November 1975) was a Hungarian wrestler. He competed in the middleweight event at the 1912 Summer Olympics.

References

External links
 

1887 births
1975 deaths
Olympic wrestlers of Hungary
Wrestlers at the 1912 Summer Olympics
Hungarian male sport wrestlers
Sportspeople from Somogy County